David Pallache (1598–1650) was born in Fez, Morocco, one of five sons of Joseph Pallache and nephews of Samuel Pallache.  He came from the Sephardic Pallache family.

Career
Pallache worked with his father in trading activities and as an agent of Moroccan state at the time. When his father traveled and stayed in Morocco, David served as his deputy in the Netherlands. In 1621, he helped negotiate a peace treaty for Morocco with France. From 1630 onwards, he took over from his brother Abraham as unofficial Dutch consul in Safi, Morocco. In 1634, apparently to clear some debts, he became involved commercially with Michael Spinoza (father of philosopher Baruch Spinoza).

He also served as agent to France, where in 1634 when Louis XIII of France demanded his father's extradition, after which David succeeded him in 1637.

Personal and death

The scholarly biography A Man of Three Worlds: Samuel Pallache, a Moroccan Jew in Catholic and Protestant Europe did not find intermarriage between the Pallache brothers or sons and members of the Portuguese Sephardic community in the Netherlands.  In fact, it documents the contrary, e.g., that sons Isaac and Joshua did not go make such marriages.  "It seems significant that no male member of the Pallache family ever married a woman from the Portuguese community...  it is surely significant that neither Samuel nor any of his heirs were ever to marry into the great trading families of 'the Portuguese nation'."  In September 2016, however, two 1643 marriage certificates were discovered for David Pallache and Judith Lindo of Antwerp, daughter of Ester Lindo  Death details for David Pallache also confirm the marriage.  Further, three years later, in 1646, Samuel Pallache, nephew of David, married Abigail (born 1622), sister of Judith Lindo.

He died in Amsterdam in 1650 and was buried in Ouderkerk in the family grave.

See also

 Sephardic Jews in the Netherlands
 History of the Jews in the Netherlands
 History of the Jews in Morocco
 Morocco–Netherlands relations
 Pallache family
 Pallache (surname)
 Samuel Pallache
 Joseph Pallache
 Isaac Pallache
 Moses Pallache
 Juda Lion Palache
 Charles Palache

References

Moroccan businesspeople
Businesspeople from Amsterdam
Dutch Sephardi Jews
16th-century Moroccan Jews
Year of birth uncertain
1650 deaths
Moroccan diplomats
People from Fez, Morocco
17th-century Moroccan Jews
16th-century Dutch businesspeople
Moroccan emigrants to the Netherlands
Σ